This is a list of members of the British Free Corps. It is based on the list printed in Appendix 5 of Adrian Weale. Renegades: Hitler's Englishmen. London: Weidenfeld & Nicolson, 1994. .  The Corps was a unit of the Waffen SS during World War II consisting of British and Dominion prisoners of war who had been recruited by the Nazis. The Corps used the SS rank structure. The column 'MI5 no.' refers to the number allocated to the member in question in MI5's Report on the British Free Corps dated 27 March 1945, which is printed in Appendix 1 of 'Renegades'.  Starting in February 1944, BFC members were ordered to adopt aliases for official purposes, although several declined to do so.

After the War, some members of the Corps were prosecuted.  Of those members, those who had been serving in the armed forces were court-martialed, while the merchant seamen and other civilians were tried in the Old Bailey. The column 'Seymer Category' refers to a list prepared by Colonel Vivian Home Seymer of MI5 on 30 August 1945 and which is held in file KV 2/2828, entitled 'The British Free Corps. Papers about the military unit established by the German authorities to exploit renegade British prisoners of war' in the National Archives

Another list, containing at least 165 names, appears in Richard Landwehr, Britisches Freikorps PP77–88, Lulu, 2008. . However the author records many members of the Corps separately under their real names and their aliases, as set out in the list below:
 Wilhelm August 'Bob' Rössler (4), Walter Plauen (100) (an alias used in 'Jackals of the Reich' PP 20 ff for "Hauptmann Werner Plack of the England Committee …  Amery's aide-cum-minder")  and ‘Fred’ Stürmer (156) (who appears on page 106 of 'Jackals of the Reich' as Captain Harry Mehner (106)) who were Germans connected with the Corps.
 Men who served in other German units (see list below), without citing any reference stating that they were also in the British Free Corps. 
 John Amery (1), George Logio (86) and Maurice Tunmer (90), who were involved with the 'Legion of St George', a forerunner of the Corps 'Tunmer, through contacts in the French Resistance, was organizing a journey across the Pyrenees so that he could travel to Britain and join de Gaulle's Free French forces in England.' 
 Raymond Davies Hughes (47), Arthur Chapple (52), Carl Hoskins (159), R. Spillman (161), William Humphrey Griffiths (163) who were 'Service renegades [who had] been employed in editing, writing scripts, and broadcasting for the enemy, and in certain cases the same men [were] also employed in journalism'. – this category also covers Railton Freeman and Walter Purdy who also served in the SS-Standarte Kurt Eggers.
 Gordon Bowler (20), John Henry Owen Brown DCM (49) (a British espionage agent), Douglas Maylin (76), Joseph Trinder (84) and RAF Bombardier Marshall (85), who had all been on the ‘staff’ at a 'holiday camp' set up by the Germans in Genshagen, a suburb of Berlin, in August 1943 – Maylin decided to join the Corps but was prevented from doing so by Thomas Haller Cooper.
 Sgt. Cushing (60), Pte. Walsh (61), Pte. O’Brien (62) and Pte. Murphy (63), "four Irishmen who ... eventually found themselves incarcerated in a special compound of Sachsenhausen concentration camp as German doubts about their essential loyalties grew. The Germans were right to be sceptical: none of the four had any real intention of working for the Nazis ... they finished the war with no stain on their characters." See Friesack Camp#Training.
 John Welch (92), who was on the 'staff' of an interrogation camp at Luckenwalde. 
 'Lieutenant Tyndal of the US Army Air Corps – this man is referred to as 'Lieutenant Tyndall' on page 80 of 'Jackals of the Reich', whose author states on page 10 that he has 'given every man a pseudonym'. This may be a reference to Martin James Monti, but Landwehr gives no reference that he was either a British subject or a member of the British Free Corps.
 Harold Cole (158), a British soldier who assisted and later betrayed the French Resistance during World War II, and who was killed while resisting arrest after the war ended. He cites no reference that Cole was a member of the Corps.

List of members

Other current or former British subjects who served in the German Armed Forces in the Second World War
This category includes citizens of neutral Eire who were captured while serving in the British Army – see British nationality law and the Republic of Ireland#British subjects with local Irish nationality. It does not include members of the BFC who also served in other units of the German armed forces, such as Thomas Haller Cooper (Waffen-SS), Roy Courlander, Dennis John Leister and Francis Paul Maton (all SS-Standarte Kurt Eggers) and Frank McLardy (SS Medical Corps Lichtenberg).

(*) Not in Weale's list.

Notes

References

British collaborators with Nazi Germany
Expatriate military units and formations
Military units and formations disestablished in 1945
Nazi SS
Lists of British military personnel
Nazi-related lists